F. Duane Ackerman (born 1942) is an American businessman. He was the last chairman and Chief Executive Officer of BellSouth Corporation.

Early life
Ackerman was raised in Plant City, Florida. In 1964, he graduated from Rollins College with a B.S. in Physics. In 1970, he graduated from the Rollins College Crummer Graduate School of Business with an MBA. In 1978, Ackerman also graduated from the MIT Sloan School of Management with a master's degree in management.

Career
Ackerman began his communications career in 1964, and has served in numerous capacities with BellSouth. In November 1992, he was named President and Chief Executive Officer of BellSouth Telecommunications, BellSouth's local telephone service unit and largest subsidiary. He was promoted to vice chairman and Chief Operating Officer in January 1995, and was elevated to the position of President and CEO in January 1997. A year later, the BellSouth board added the chairman's responsibilities to Ackerman's portfolio, and he served as chairman and CEO until BellSouth's merger with AT&T on December 29, 2006. In 2006, his total annual compensation was a reported $13.97 million, with a 5-year compensational total of $43.30 million.

The SBC-AT&T merger created a uniquely complex situation for Ackerman with regards to Cingular Wireless, a joint venture between BellSouth and SBC.  After the SBC/AT&T merger, the new AT&T began competing with BellSouth for lucrative business landline customers in BellSouth's primary market, disturbing the historical territorial lines between the former Regional Bell Operating Companies or RBOCs (SBC and BellSouth). Indeed, this issue, as well as the desire for AT&T to entirely control the highly-profitable Cingular venture, led AT&T to purchase BellSouth outright.

Ackerman serves on the President's Council of Advisors on Science and Technology and is immediate past chairman of the U.S. Council on Competitiveness, as well as the National Security Telecommunications Advisory Committee. He is a former member of the Homeland Security Advisory Council. A past chair of the Georgia Partnership for Excellence in Education, Ackerman is vice chairman of the Rollins College Board of Trustees and a former member of the Board of Governors for the Society of Sloan Fellows of MIT.

Awards and honors
In 2017, he was inducted as a Georgia Trustee, an honor given by the Georgia Historical Society in conjunction with the Governor of Georgia to individuals whose accomplishments and community service reflect the ideals of the founding body of Trustees, which governed the Georgia colony from 1732 to 1752.

References

American chief executives
MIT Sloan School of Management alumni
MIT Sloan Fellows
People from Plant City, Florida
Rollins College alumni
Living people
1942 births
American chief operating officers